Fechner is a surname. Notable people with the surname include:

 Carl-A. Fechner (born 1952), German documentary filmmaker
 Christian Fechner (1944–2008), French film producer and screenwriter
 Gino Fechner (born 1997), German footballer
 Gustav Fechner (1801–1887), German experimental psychologist, physicist and philosopher
 Harry Fechner (born 1950), German football defender
 Johannes Fechner (born 1965), German politician
 Max Fechner (1892–1973), Minister of Justice of the GDR
 Robert Fechner (1876–1939), American union leader
 Sebastian Fechner (born 1983), Polish footballer

See also 
 Fechner color, an illusion of color
 Weber–Fechner law
 Fechner (crater), a lunar crater
 11041 Fechner (1989 SH2), a main-belt asteroid discovered on 1989 by E. W. Elst

German-language surnames